Julia Parsons (also McGuire) is a fictional character from the BBC soap opera Doctors, portrayed by Diane Keen. She made her first appearance on 13 January 2003, and departed the show on 18 May 2012, after nine years of appearing in the series. On 21 November 2019, it was announced that Keen would be reprising her role as Julia in March 2020 for the 20th anniversary of Doctors. She returned from 25 to 27 March 2020.

Storylines
Julia begins working on reception at the Riverside Health Centre alongside ex-husband Mac McGuire (Christopher Timothy). The two begin their relationship again and Mac later proposes to Julia, which subsequently leads them to get married for a second time. Julia catches Mac kissing his ex-wife Kate McGuire (Maggie Cronin) and forces them to leave with their son. Julia, now divorced, buys Mac's share of the surgery, now renamed the Mill Health Centre, and becomes the practice manager. Julia reluctantly dismisses her friend Donna Parmar (Martha Howe-Douglas) due to a breach of patient confidentiality. Donna is replaced with another of Julia's friends, Vivien March (Anita Carey). Julia persuades mentally ill colleague Ruth Pearce (Selina Chilton) to move in with her due to her instability, where Julia cares for her until Ruth returns to work. Julia supports nurse Michelle Corrigan (Donnaleigh Bailey) when she chose to work as an army nurse in Afghanistan. Michelle's mother, Vera Corrigan (Doña Croll), becomes angry with Julia as she blames Julia for Michelle's enlisting. Months later, Julia falls ill with symptoms of delusions and confusion, later diagnosed as Lyme disease. Whilst at home recovering from the disease, she becomes the victim of sexual assault by colleague Charlie Bradfield (Philip McGough), who is later reported and dismissed from the Mill for misconduct.

Julia meets garage owner Martin Millar (Miles Anderson) after parking her car in the way of his garage. The two begin dating, but the couple begin not to trust each other, they break up. They later get back together, but when Julia googles Martin and finds out that he was accused of arson, they end their relationship. Martin later reveals that he has had five wives, and that he had a daughter with his third. Julia is stunned by this and rejects Martin. She meets up with Martin again, but when Martin says that he wants to retire and move to Wales, she once again rejects him, as she does not want this. They keep arguing about this, and whilst they are, their car crashes with another vehicle, and they are both knocked unconscious. Martin and Julia survive and the two embrace. Julia's son Patrick (Alan McKenna) arrives, wanting to take her to his house, so that she can recover. However, after thinking about whether or not she wants a future with Martin, she decides she does, and goes to live with him. Julia returns to the Mill years later after she hears that her former colleague Jimmi Clay (Adrian Lewis Morgan) is being released from prison after being wrongfully convicted. She helps him ease back into normal life and asks if he would like to move to France with her, but he declines.

Development

Departure

After Keen made the decision to leave the soap after nine years, Miles Anderson was cast, playing Martin, to coincide with the departure of Julia. Digital Spy said of her departure storyline; "Fans should also keep an eye out for a possible new love interest for Julia when she gets to know garage owner Martin Millar in a few weeks' time. It sounds like there's lots on the way for Julia in the next few weeks". Keen said of Martin's and Julia's relationship; "She's fighting it all the way, because she's had so many disastrous relationships in her life, so now she tends to take the negative point of view towards how something will turn out. Martin's really great because he won't take any nonsense and he's not taking no for an answer. He's forcing Julia to really give it a shot, and she needs that. She's obviously very attracted to him, too, so they could be very good together". Of the car stunt she said that it was filmed "on a mad, stormy, windy, rainy day". She called the stunt "phenomenal" and "amazing" saying, "In the end the scenes looked incredible because of that. It was very exciting for everybody, as we don't often get to do stunts like that on Doctors".

Return
In November 2019, Doctors began filming for the 20th anniversary, and it was announce that as part of the celebrations for the milestone, Keen would return in March 2020.

Julia is reintroduced when a documentary is being made about The Mill, to film a segment. She also supports Jimmi Clay (Adrian Lewis Morgan) with adjusting to normal life after his release from prison.

Reception
For her portrayal of Julia, Keen was annually nominated for the British Soap Award for Best Actress between the 2005 and 2010 British Soap Awards. She was nominated for Best Actress again in 2012. Julia's car crash was also nominated for the Spectacular Scene of the Year award at 2013 ceremony. Keen won in the Actress category at the 2008 RTS Midlands Awards. The character was also selected as one of the "top 100 British soap characters" by industry experts for a poll ran by What's on TV, with readers able to vote for their favourite character to discover "Who is Soap's greatest Legend?"

References

External links
 Julia Parsons at BBC Online

Doctors (2000 TV series) characters
Female characters in television
Fictional managers
Fictional receptionists
Television characters introduced in 2003